Serapias vomeracea, common name long-lipped serapias or the plow-share serapias, is a species of orchid in the genus Serapias.

Etymology 
The name Serapias of the genus derives from the Greek Sarapis, the Graeco-Egyptian god, already used in ancient times to name some orchids. The Latin name vomeracea of this species refers to the shape of the apical portion of the labellum (epichile) reminiscent of a ploughshare.

Description 
 Serapias vomeracea is an herbaceous perennial plant with two ovoidal underground tubers. This species is highly variable in color and shape. The stem is green, with two membranous basal leaves and 6-8 upper leaves, lanceolate and glossy green or reddish.

The inflorescence is composed by a narrow and elongated spike, with three to ten flowers. The relevant bracts are lanceolate and much longer than the tepals. Their color is red-purple, with darker longitudinal venation. The outer tepals are lanceolate and erect, forming an helmet-like structure. Their color is purple-red or pinkish, with veins of darker color. The internal lateral tepals are brownish-purple and almost entirely hidden by the helmet.

The labellum is brick red, trilobed and larger than the other tepals. The basal portion (hypochile) of the labellum is concave and enclosed in the helmet, with two raised and hairy lateral lobes. The apical portion of the labellum (epichile) is triangular-lanceolate, usually purple-red and quite hairy. The spur is missing. The flowering period extends from March to June.

Reproduction 
Serapias vomeracea is an entomophilous plant, but cannot offer floral rewards to pollinators as it does not produce nectar. Therefore, pollinators are just attracted by the shape of the flower, forming a small tube used by insects to rest by night or as a refuge against the rain. In this process pollen gets stuck to the pollinators' bodies. Once they leave their shelter, they will deposit the pollen on other flowers and fertilize them. These orchids are mainly pollinated by some beetles (families Oedemeridae and Lymexylidae) and by bees (genera Ceratina, Eucera and Osmia). Seeds are dispersed by the wind (anemochory).

Subspecies 
 Serapias vomeracea (Burm. f.) Briq.  subsp. vomeracea
 Serapias vomeracea  (Burm. f.) Briq. subsp. longipetala  (Ten.) H. Baumann & Künkele 
 Serapias vomeracea (Burm. f.) Briq. subsp. laxiflora  (Soó) Gölz & H.R. Reinhard

Distribution 

Habitat 

Gallery

References 

 G. Pellegrino, D. Gargano, M. E. Noce, A. Musacchio - Reproductive biology and pollinator limitation in a deceptive orchid, Serapias vomeracea (Orchidaceae) - Plant Species Biology - Volume 20, Issue 1, pages 33–39, April 2005
 Pignatti S. - Flora d'Italia (3 voll.) - Edagricole – 1982, Vol. III
 Tutin, T.G. et al. - Flora Europaea, second edition - 1993

External links 
 Biolib
 Altervista Flora Italiana Serapias vomeracea
 Actaplantarum
 Giros

vomeracea
Orchids of Europe
Flora of Malta
Taxa named by Nicolaas Laurens Burman